Linn, formerly San Manuel-Linn, is an unincorporated area and census-designated place (CDP) in Hidalgo County, Texas, United States. The population was 801 at the 2010 census, down from 958 at the 2000 census. It is part of the McAllen–Edinburg–Mission Metropolitan Statistical Area.

Geography
Linn is in northern Hidalgo County at  (26.564558, -98.129217), along U.S. Route 281, State Highway 186, and FM 1017.

Demographics

2020 census

As of the 2020 United States census, there were 733 people, 239 households, and 157 families residing in the CDP.

2000 census
As of the census of 2000, there were 958 people, 328 households, and 270 families residing in the CDP. The population density was 19.7 people per square mile (7.6/km2). There were 702 housing units at an average density of 14.4/sq mi (5.6/km2). The racial makeup of the CDP was 81.52% White, 1.04% Native American, 0.21% Asian, 16.28% from other races, and 0.94% from two or more races. Hispanic or Latino of any race were 73.80% of the population.

There were 328 households, out of which 30.8% had children under the age of 18 living with them, 70.4% were married couples living together, 9.8% had a female householder with no husband present, and 17.4% were non-families. 15.9% of all households were made up of individuals, and 10.7% had someone living alone who was 65 years of age or older. The average household size was 2.92 and the average family size was 3.26.

In the CDP, the population was spread out, with 26.9% under the age of 18, 7.9% from 18 to 24, 21.3% from 25 to 44, 21.0% from 45 to 64, and 22.9% who were 65 years of age or older. The median age was 38 years. For every 100 females, there were 90.8 males. For every 100 females age 18 and over, there were 90.7 males.

The median income for a household in the CDP was $26,406, and the median income for a family was $27,596. Males had a median income of $31,111 versus $16,875 for females. The per capita income for the CDP was $11,707. About 19.4% of families and 28.4% of the population were below the poverty line, including 51.3% of those under age 18 and 5.2% of those age 65 or over.

Education
The community is served by the Edinburg Consolidated Independent School District (ECISD). Zoned schools include the Brewster School, which houses Pre-Kindergarten through 8th grade, and Edinburg North High School (9-12).

In addition, South Texas Independent School District operates magnet schools that serve the community.

All of Hidalgo County is in the service area of South Texas College.

Climate
The climate in this area is characterized by hot, humid summers and generally mild to cool winters.  According to the Köppen Climate Classification system, San Manuel-Linn has a humid subtropical climate, abbreviated "Cfa" on climate maps.

References

Census-designated places in Hidalgo County, Texas
Census-designated places in Texas